Walter Surovy (sometimes spelled Szurovy; 28 May 1910 in Vienna – 4 November 2001 in Manhattan, New York City) was an Austrian stage and film actor.

He appeared in leading roles at the Theater in der Josefstadt, the Salzburg Festival, and the Neues Deutsches Theater. He starred in several European films before moving to Hollywood, where a brief acting career led to a role in Howard Hawks' To Have and Have Not (under the name Walter Molnar).

He was the manager and husband of mezzo-soprano singer Risë Stevens. The couple wed in 1939 and remained together until Surovy's death in 2001. They had one child, a son, actor Nicolas Surovy. In 1941, he founded the Polk-Szurovy Agency. After his wife retired, he managed the career of Erich Leinsdorf.

Filmography

References

External links

1910 births
2001 deaths
Austrian male stage actors
Austrian male film actors
Male actors from Vienna
Austrian emigrants to the United States
20th-century Austrian male actors